Solar Valley may refer to:

 Solar Valley (China), industrial area in China
 Solar Valley (Germany), industrial area in Germany
 Trübbach a village in Switzerland

See also
 Solar (disambiguation)
 Valley (disambiguation)